The Aurora Vehicle Association is a group of volunteers who are dedicated to achieving and demonstrating extreme efficiency in transport. Aurora was started in 1980 by building high-fuel-efficiency petrol-powered vehicles. Between 1983 and 1985 Aurora held the world record for fuel economy at 1808 km per litre (5107 miles per imperial gallon). In 1987, when Hans Tholstrup devised the first trans-Australian World Solar Challenge, Aurora turned to solar car development and has been a contestant in every World Solar Challenge and has achieved 1 win, 4 second places, 1 third place, 1 fifth place, 1 sixth place and 1 crash.

Aurora is a non-profit group which is sustained by corporate sponsorship from companies such as CSIRO, Mazda and Sumitomo (amongst many others).

At various points in its history, Aurora has also been associated with some of Australia's leading universities such as UNSW, University of Technology, Sydney, University of Melbourne and RMIT.

Cars 

Aurora have constructed several solar-powered cars and are now in their 4th generation of car designs.

Ford Model "S" - 1987

Christine - 1990

Aurora Q1 - 1993

Southern Aurora - 2000

Aurora 101 - 1996

The current flagship  is known as Aurora Evolution (Previously Aurora 101). The car weighs 120 kg without batteries or a driver and has attained speeds of 155 km/h. It is built around a triangular carbon fibre frame (with a circular cross section) with a single driven front wheel and two rear wheels. The car's body is attached to the frame at three points through springs and shock absorbers.

The car is extremely aerodynamic, with a drag coefficient of 0.1 and a frontal area of 0.76 square metres. The motor, which was developed as a joint effort between CSIRO, the University of Technology, Sydney and Aurora, weighs 15 kg and has a continuous operating power of 1.8 kW.

The car's power comes from its solar array, which covers a majority of the upper half of its body. There is a total of 5.98 square metres of silicon solar cells, which originally provided up to 1250 W but now provides closer to 1200 W due to degradation.
In full racing trim (as per the World Solar Challenge rules) the car weighs 240 kg with its batteries and driver.

Aurora 101 finished second in the 2003 WSC race

Aurora 101 finished 3rd in the 2007 WSC race.

 Fastest lap at Hidden Valley Racetrack, Darwin Average speed 91.83 km/h.
 Fastest lap at Suzuka Racetrack Average speed 93.08 km/h.
 Distance covered in 24 hours non-stop record 1590 km.

World Records

Aurora in WSC

References

External links 
 Aurora Solar Car Home Page

Solar car racing